Saccharum officinarum is a large, strong-growing species of grass in the genus Saccharum. Its stout stalks are rich in sucrose, a simple sugar which accumulates in the stalk internodes. It originated in New Guinea, and is now cultivated in tropical and subtropical countries worldwide for the production of sugar, ethanol and other products.

Saccharum officinarum is one of the most productive and most intensively cultivated kinds of sugarcane. It can interbreed with other sugarcane species, such as Saccharum sinense and Saccharum barberi. 
The major commercial cultivars are complex hybrids.
About 70% of the sugar produced worldwide comes from S. officinarum and hybrids using this species.

Description
Saccharum officinarum, a perennial plant, grows in clumps consisting of a number of strong unbranched stems. A network of rhizomes forms under the soil which sends up secondary shoots near the parent plant. The stems vary in colour, being green, pinkish, or purple and can reach  in height. They are jointed, nodes being present at the bases of the alternate leaves. The internodes contain a fibrous white pith immersed in sugary sap. The fruits are dry and each one contains a single seed. Sugarcane harvest typically occurs before the plants flower, as the flowering process causes a reduction in sugar content.

Taxonomy 

Saccharum officinarum was first domesticated in New Guinea and the islands east of the Wallace Line by Papuans, where it is the modern center of diversity. Beginning at around 6,000 BP it was selectively bred from the native Saccharum robustum. From New Guinea it spread westwards to Island Southeast Asia after contact with Austronesians, where it hybridized with S. spontaneum.

The Hawaiian word for this species is kō.

Uses 
Portions of the stem of this and several other species of sugarcane have been used from ancient times for chewing to extract the sweet juice. It was cultivated in New Guinea about 8,000 years ago for this purpose. Extraction of the juice and boiling to concentrate it was probably first done in India more than 2,000 years ago.

Saccharum officinarum and its hybrids are grown for the production of sugar, ethanol, and other industrial uses in tropical and subtropical regions around the world. The stems and the byproducts of the sugar industry are used for feeding to livestock. Pigs fed on sugarcane juice and a soy-based protein supplement produced stronger piglets that grew faster than those on a more conventional diet. As its specific name (officinarum, "of dispensaries") implies, it is also used in traditional medicine both internally and externally.

See also
 Domesticated plants and animals of Austronesia

References

External links
 
 

officinarum
Flora of New Guinea
Crops originating from Asia
Flora of the Dominican Republic
Plants described in 1753
Taxa named by Carl Linnaeus
Flora without expected TNC conservation status